A Crime (French title: Un crime) is a 2006 thriller film directed by Manuel Pradal, written by Pradal and Tonino Benacquista, and starring Emmanuelle Béart.

The film unfolds the story of Vincent (Norman Reedus) who looks for his wife's killer. In the process, his neighbor Alice (Emmanuelle Béart) decides to invent a culprit, so that he can find revenge. However, there is no ideal culprit and crime.

Synopsis
In the evening, while returning to his place, Vincent Harris (Reedus) crosses a taxi coming from his house. When he arrives, it is too late: his wife Ashley was brutally murdered.  Three years later, Vincent moves to New York, and his neighbor, Alice Parker (Béart), is frantically in love with him, but having been always distressed and obsessed to discover the assassin of his woman, he himself does not recognize any feeling at least. To make Vincent be free to open his heart to her, Alice is willing to find the man responsible for his wife's death. When Alice hails a cab driven by lonely New Yorker Roger Culkin (Keitel), her elaborate plan is slowly set into motion in spite of the ignorance of both men.

Cast
 Emmanuelle Béart as Alice Parker
 Norman Reedus as Vincent Harris
 Harvey Keitel as Roger Culkin
 Joe Grifasi as Bill
 Lily Rabe as Sophie
 Kim Director as Ashley Harris
 Chuck Cooper as Will
 Ted Koch as Scott
 Ben Wang as Chinese Man
 Stephen Payne as Mark
 Brian Tarantina as Joe
 Patrick Collins as Ben
 Clem Cheung as Li Huang
 Jonathan Lam as "Baby-Face"
 Natalie Caron as Jenny

References

External links

 
Movieforum: TIFF 2006: "UN CRIME"
Twitch - TIFF Report: UN CRIME Review

2006 films
2006 crime thriller films
French neo-noir films
English-language French films
Films scored by Ennio Morricone
Films scored by Theodore Shapiro
Films set in New York City
Films directed by Manuel Pradal
French crime thriller films
2000s English-language films
2000s French films